Santo Domingo Oeste is a municipality of the Santo Domingo province in the Dominican Republic. It is part of the greater Santo Domingo metropolitan area, which is the de facto co-capital of the Dominican Republic as seat of the Constitutional Court and the Central Electoral Commission. 

For comparison with other municipalities and municipal districts see the list of municipalities and municipal districts of the Dominican Republic.

Santo Domingo Oeste was created as municipality in 2001 by law 163-01 splitting the Santo Domingo province from the Distrito Nacional including parts of metropolitan Santo Domingo west of the DR-1 (Autopista Duarte).

References

Populated places in Santo Domingo Province
Municipalities of the Dominican Republic